Eliza Stewart was a sailing ship built in 1833. She traded with Australia, China, and India and was last listed in 1843, having wrecked in early 1844.

History
Eliza Stewart entered the Register of Shipping in 1833 with Miller, master, Stewart, owner, and trade London-Bombay. 

In 1841 a group of passengers who had sailed from London to Australia on the ship published a letter in The Sydney Morning Herald thanking Captain Robert Millar for his "polite, kind and gentlemanly conduct" to them on the voyage and noting the "very liberal manner in which we were provided and our comforts attended to whilst on board his ship", and thanking Messrs Phillips and Tiplady as charterers of the ship.

Eliza Stewart was last listed in Lloyd's Register in 1843 with McLeod, master, Stewart, owner, homeport of Glasgow, and trade London-Bombay.

 and  shared salvage money for Eliza Stewart and her cargo for assistance they rendered to Eliza Stewart between 29 January and 25 February 1844.

Notes

Citations

Age of Sail merchant ships of England
Victorian-era merchant ships of the United Kingdom
1833 ships
Maritime incidents in January 1844